Lamnizla (also El Had Mnzila or El-Menizla) is a village and rural commune in Taroudant Province of the Souss-Massa-Drâa region of Morocco. At the time of the 2004 census, the commune had a total population of 4994 people living in 773 households. The village is situated in the foothills of the Atlas Mountains.

References

Populated places in Taroudannt Province
Rural communes of Souss-Massa